John Groppo (August 14, 1921 – June 12, 2013) was an American mason contractor, businessman, and politician.

Born in Winsted, Connecticut, Groppo served in the United States Marine Corps during World War II. He was a stonemason and was the owner of Leo Groppo & Son Mason Contractors. He served as mayor of Winsted, Connecticut 1965 to 1967. From 1959 to 1985 he served in the Connecticut House of Representatives as a Democrat and was majority leader. In 1985–1987, Groppo was commissioner of the Connecticut Department of Revenue Services. He died in Winsted, Connecticut.

Notes

1921 births
2013 deaths
People from Winsted, Connecticut
Businesspeople from Connecticut
Mayors of places in Connecticut
Democratic Party members of the Connecticut House of Representatives
20th-century American businesspeople
United States Marine Corps personnel of World War II